Abhijeet Chavan (Marathi: अभिजित चव्हाण) is a Marathi and Hindi film, television and stage actor, notable for his comic roles in Marathi theatre and Marathi films and television from India. He played role of Shridhar Mahajan  in the daily soap Asa Saasar Surekh Bai on Colors Marathi channel. He also works in the web series known as Struggler Saala, available on YouTube

Career

Television
He is famous for the character "Master", supported by Ashish Pawar who plays "Bandu" the student and many more in the Marathi comedy series, Comedy Express. His punch line, "Benchvar.... Bench var ubha Karen", is famous with viewers.

Marathi movies
He appeared in the movies Shan (2006), Gojiri (2007) and Majha Naav Shivaji (2016).

Hindi movies
He played a bouncer in the movie Split Wide Open (1999). He also played an auto rickshaw driver in the scene which included three Mumbai auto rickshaws that show up in Germany and jump on a police car to rescue / save Himesh Reshammiya in Aap Kaa Surroor: The Moviee - The Real Luv Story (2007).

References

External links

Indian male film actors
Living people
Male actors in Marathi cinema
Male actors in Marathi theatre
1975 births